Bobby Kinnear (1851–1935) was an Aboriginal Australian sprinter who won the Stawell Gift in 1883.

References

1851 births
1935 deaths
Indigenous Australian track and field athletes
Australian male sprinters
Stawell Gift winners